The Edmonton Dodgers were a baseball team located in Edmonton, Alberta, Canada.  The Dodgers replaced the Edmonton Cubs in the Big Four League for the 1950 season.  In their only season, the Dodgers won the league championship by defeating the Edmonton Eskimos (baseball).

References

Dod
Defunct minor league baseball teams
Defunct baseball teams in Canada
Baseball teams in Alberta
1950 establishments in Alberta
1950 disestablishments in Alberta
Baseball teams established in 1950
Sports clubs disestablished in 1950